WLDS (1180 AM) is a radio station licensed to Jacksonville, Illinois. The station airs a Talk radio format with local news, agricultural reports and sports.  It is owned by Jacksonville Area Radio Broadcasters Inc.

By day, WLDS is powered at 300 watts.  But because 1180 AM is a clear channel frequency reserved for WHAM Rochester, New York, WLDS must reduce power at night to 2 watts to avoid interference.  

References

External links

LDS
Companies based in Morgan County, Illinois
Jacksonville, Illinois micropolitan area
1941 establishments in Illinois
Radio stations established in 1941
LDS